Tu Zhen (8 March 1934 – 21 September 2022) was a Chinese translator best known for her contributions to the introduction of English literature to Chinese readers. She was a member of the Chinese Peasants' and Workers' Democratic Party and a member of the China Writers Association. She was a professor at the University of International Business and Economics (Beijing). She was a member of the 7th and 8th Beijing Municipal Committee of the Chinese People's Political Consultative Conference.

Biography
Tu was born in Beiping, on 8 March 1934, while her ancestral home is in Changzhou, Jiangsu. She attended Beiping Private Mingming Primary School, Sacred Heart Girls' School and Tianjin Saint John's Girls' School. In 1951, she was admitted to Yenching University. She studied French at the beginning, but switched to English a year later. In the same year, Yenching University was incorporated into Peking University during the adjustment of departments and colleges. So she became a student of Peking University.

She started to publish works in 1956, and joined the faculty of University of International Business and Economics (Beijing). She joined the China Writers Association in 1982 and later became a member of the PEN International. She retired in 1997.

On 21 September 2022, Tu died in Los Angeles, California, at the age of 88.

Personal life
Tu was married to Mei Shaowu, son of renowned Beijing opera actor Mei Lanfang, he was also a translator.

Translations

References

1934 births
2022 deaths
Writers from Beijing
Peking University alumni
Academic staff of Beijing University of International Business and Economics
Chinese Peasants' and Workers' Democratic Party politicians
English–Chinese translators